Tengrism—the Turko-Mongolic ethnic religion—may include both old folk traditions and neo-Tengrist movements, which try to reconstruct old native beliefs.

Movements are distributed according to their ethnicity with year of foundation.

List 
 Altaian, Kumandin, and Teleut
 Altaian shamanism
 Agaru Sang ( — Sacral Altar) (1996)
 Altaian center of Chemalsky district (1999)
 Burkhanism/Ak Jang (1904)
 Altai Faith
 Sacral Altai public ecological organization (2016)
 Altai Faith White Faith (2004)
 Soul Ecology School "Tengri" (1995)
 Spiritual and Health center "Ak Sanaa"
 Spiritual center of the Turks "Kin Altai" (2005)
 Tengrism—Heavenly Faith (2010)
 Azerbaijani and Qashqai
 Bashkir
 Bonan
 Buryat and Soyot
 Buryat folk religion spiritual center "BƟƟ Murgel" (1991)
 Buryat Shamans' association "BƟƟ Murgel" (1991)
 Council of Shamanistic communities of the Baikal region (2008)
 Shamans' religion organization "Tengeri" (2003)
 Chulym
 Chuvash
 Vattisen Yaly
 Chuvash National Congress (1989–1992)
 Chuvash Traditional Faith Organization "Tura" (1995)
 Fund for the Support of the Chuvash National Culture "Sawar" (2012)
 Crimean Tatar
 Tengri Society
 Daur
 Daur shamanism
 Dolgan
 Dongxiang
 Dukhan
 Dukhan shamanism
 Gagauz
 Hamnigan
 Kalmyk
 Center for the Development of Modern Oirat Culture "Tengrin Uidl" (Milky Way) Kalmyk public organization (2010)
 Kangjia
 Karachay and Balkar
 Karaim
 Karakalpak
 Kazakh
 Khaganate
 World of the Great Steppe public association (Dalaruh)
 Khakas
 Khakas Heritage Center—the Society of Traditional Religion of Khakas Shamanism "Ah-Chayan" (1994)
 Traditional religion of the Khakas people society "Izykh"
 Traditional religion society "Khan Tigir"
 Khalaj
 Khatso
 Khorasani Turk
 Khoton
 Krymchak
 Crimean Society of Krymchaks "Krymchahlar" (Krymchak: Kърымчахлар) (1989)
 Kumyk
 Kyrgyz and Fuyu Kyrgyz
 Aigine
 Alty Yurt
 Manas Ordo
 Tengir Ordo (2005)
 Tengirchilik
 Moghol
 Mongolian
 Mongolian shamanism/Tengerism
 Heaven's Dagger
 Mongolian Shamans' Association (Golomt Tuv)
 Circle of Tengerism (Mongolian shamanic association of America)
 Golomt Center for Shamanist Studies
 Samgaldai Tengrist Center
 Monguor
 Nogai
 Salar
 Shor
 Siberian Tatar
 Sichuan Mongol
 Sogwo Arig
 Tatar
 Tofalar
 Turkish
 Turkmen
 Tuvan
 Centralized religion shamanistic organization "The office of the Supreme Shaman of Tuva"
 Charitable Fund of Support and Conservation of Shamanism "The Sun" ("Hun")
 Shamans' religion organization "Adyg-Eeren" ("Spirit of the Bear")
 Shamans' religion organization "Tengri Uger" ("Heavenly Bull")
 Shamans' religion organization "Tos-Deer" ("Nine Heavens") (1998)
 Tuvan Shamans' religion organization "Dungur" ("Drum") (1991)
 Uyghur, Äynu, and Ili Turk
 Uzbek
 Yakut (Sakha)
 Aar Aiyy Faith (1996)
 Aiyy Faith, former Kut-Siur (1990)
 Aiyy Tangara Faith (2019)
 Iteghel (Faith) (1995)
 White Aiyy Faith
 Yugur
 Non-Turko-Mongolic
 Korean shamanism
 Manchu shamanism
 Sámi shamanism
 Tangra Warriors movement
 Uralic neopaganism (partly)
 Interethnic
 International Fund of Tengri Research (2011)

See also 
 List of Tengrist states and dynasties

Footnotes

Bibliography

External links 
 Center for the Development of Modern Oirat Culture "Tengrin Uidl" (Milky Way) Kalmyk public organization — official website 
 Circle of Tengerism (Mongolian shamanic association of America) — official website 
 International Fund of Tengri Research — official website 
 Samgaldai Tengrist Center — official website 
 Shamans' religion organization "Adyg-Eeren" ("Spirit of the Bear") — official website (in Tuvan)
 Shamans' religion organization "Tengeri" — official website 
 Tangra Warriors movement — official website (in Bulgarian)
 World of the Great Steppe public association (Dalaruh) — official website 
 the largest website about Tengrism (Kazakhstan) — official website 

Tengrist
Tengrist
Tengriism